Esau McCaulley is an American biblical scholar and Assistant Professor of New Testament at Wheaton College, Illinois.

Biography
McCaulley majored in history at the University of the South matriculating in 1998 and graduating with the Bachelor of Arts in 2002. He earned a  Master of Divinity at Gordon Conwell Theological Seminary, graduating in 2005. He also pursued a Master of Sacred Theology at Nashotah House between 2008 and 2012. He completed his PhD in New Testament in 2017 at the University of St Andrews, supervised by N.T. Wright.

Since 2019, McCaulley has been Assistant Professor of New Testament at Wheaton College. He was ordained in the Anglican Church in North America (ACNA), but is on sabbatical from active ministry in that denomination. He presently serves as Theologian in Residence at Progressive Baptist, a historically black congregation in Chicago, IL. He is a contributing writer on several outlets such as Christianity Today, The Washington Post, and The New York Times.

His first book, Sharing in the Son’s Inheritance, based on his dissertation, is a study on the book of Galatians which explores the link between Paul's understanding of Jesus as Davidic Messiah and a view that the Abrahamic land promise encompasses the whole earth. His second book, Reading While Black, advocates for what he terms a "Black ecclesial interpretation" of the Bible based on the experiences and the cultural perspectives of the African American community. It is less about promoting a different meaning of the text of the Bible, as it is saying that the reader's experiences shape different questions for the Bible which render new insights.

In 2020, McCaulley received the "Emerging Public Intellectual Award" from Redeemer University. His Reading While Black won the 2021 Christianity Today book award, under the category "Beautiful Orthodoxy."

Personal life
McCaulley is a military spouse and is married to Mandy, a pediatrician. Together they have four children.

Works
 Josey Johnson’s Hair and the Holy Spirit. Downers Grove, IL: IVP Kids, 2022. 
 Reading While Black: African American Biblical Interpretation as an Exercise in Hope. Downers Grove, IL: IVP, 2020. 
 Sharing in the Son’s Inheritance: Davidic Messianism and Paul’s Worldwide Interpretation of the Abrahamic Land Promise in Galatians. London, UK: T & T Clark, 2019.

References

 

Living people
Year of birth missing (living people)
Gordon–Conwell Theological Seminary alumni
Alumni of the University of St Andrews
African-American Christian clergy
American Anglican Church in North America priests
21st-century African-American people
African-American biblical scholars